The fifth season of the HBO supernatural drama series True Blood premiered on June 10, 2012 and features 12 episodes, bringing the series total to 60. It picks up right after the events of season four.  It is loosely based on the fifth book in The Southern Vampire Mysteries series, Dead as a Doornail, but incorporates much more of the following books than the previous seasons have.

Cast and characters

Main cast

 Anna Paquin as Sookie Stackhouse
 Stephen Moyer as Bill Compton
 Sam Trammell as Sam Merlotte
 Ryan Kwanten as Jason Stackhouse
 Rutina Wesley as Tara Thornton
 Alexander Skarsgård as Eric Northman
 Christopher Meloni as Roman Zimojic
 Chris Bauer as Andy Bellefleur
 Kristin Bauer van Straten as Pam Swynford De Beaufort
 Lauren Bowles as Holly Cleary
 Valentina Cervi as Salome Agrippa
 Nelsan Ellis as Lafayette Reynolds
 Scott Foley as Patrick Devins
 Janina Gavankar as Luna Garza
 Lucy Griffiths as Nora Gainesborough
 Todd Lowe as Terry Bellefleur
 Joe Manganiello as Alcide Herveaux
 Michael McMillian as Steve Newlin
 Denis O'Hare as Russell Edgington
 Jim Parrack as Hoyt Fortenberry
 Carrie Preston as Arlene Fowler Bellefleur
 Deborah Ann Woll as Jessica Hamby

Special guest cast

 Kevin Alejandro as Jesus Velasquez
 William Sanderson as Bud Dearborn
 Alfre Woodard as Ruby Jean Reynolds
 Adina Porter as Lettie Mae Daniels

Guest cast

 Carolyn Hennesy as Rosalyn Harris
 Peter Mensah as Kibwe Akinjide
 Giles Matthey as Claude Crane
 Dale Dickey as Martha Bozeman
 Louis Herthum as JD Carson
 Christopher Heyerdahl as Dieter Braun
 John Rezig as Deputy Kevin Ellis
 Jamie Gray Hyder as Danielle
 Tina Majorino as Molly
 Kelly Overton as Rikki Naylor
 Chloe Noelle as Emma Garza
 Jessica Clark as Lilith
 Camilla Luddington as Claudette Crane
 Jacob Hopkins as Alexander Drew
 Brendan McCarthy as Nate
 Tanya Wright as Deputy Kenya Jones
 John Billingsley as Mike Spencer
 Emma Greenwell as Claudia Crane
 Robert Patrick as Jackson Herveaux
 Patricia Bethune as Jane Bodehouse
 Tara Buck as Ginger
 Allan Hyde as Godric
 Dale Raoul as Maxine Fortenberry
 Aaron Christian Howles as Rocky Cleary
 Keram Malicki-Sánchez as Elijah Stormer
 Noah Matthews as Wade Cleary
 Alec Gray as Coby Fowler
 Mariana Klaveno as Lorena Krasiki
 Laurel Weber as Lisa Fowler
 Erica Gimpel as Faerie Elder

Episodes

Production 
True Blood was officially renewed for a fifth season on August 11, 2011.

In February, 2012 it was announced that creator Alan Ball would be stepping down as showrunner at the end of the fifth season. Ball will continue on as executive producer in a more advisory role and leave the day-to-day production of the series to others. "Because of the fantastic cast, writers, producers and crew, with whom I have been lucky enough to work these past five years, I know I could step back and the show will continue to thrive," said Ball in a statement.

Series co-star Stephen Moyer made his directorial debut with the eighth episode of season five, titled "Somebody That I Used to Know." D.E.B.S. writer/director and former The L Word producer Angela Robinson has joined the writing staff. She wrote episodes five and eleven.

Series co-star Rutina Wesley confirmed that the character Tara would be returning.

Ratings

References 

2012 American television seasons
True Blood
Iraq War in television